Gerba Guracha (also known as Kuyyuu or Roobi; Oromo: Garba Gurraacha) is a town in central Ethiopia. Located in  the North Shewa Zone of  Oromia Region, Ethiopia, it is an inland port city in Selale. It is the administrative center of Kuyu woreda.

This town has had telephone service at least as early as 1967.

C.F. Rey mentions passing through Gerba Guracha (which he describes it as a village) in January 1927. Records at the Nordic Africa Institute website provide details of a primary school there in 1968.

Demographics 
Based on figures from the Central Statistical Agency in 2005, Gebra Guracha has an estimated total population of 19,830 of whom 9,184 were males and 10,646 were females. The 1994 national census reported this town had a total population of 11,113 of whom 4,981 were males and 6,132 were females.

Notes 

Populated places in the Oromia Region